In mathematics, and more specifically number theory, the superfactorial of a positive integer  is the product of the first  factorials. They are a special case of the Jordan–Pólya numbers, which are products of arbitrary collections of factorials.

Definition
The th superfactorial  may be defined as:

Following the usual convention for the empty product, the superfactorial of 0 is 1.

Properties
Just as the factorials can be continuously interpolated by the gamma function, the superfactorials can be continuously interpolated by the Barnes G-function.

According to an analogue of Wilson's theorem on the behavior of factorials modulo prime numbers, when  is an odd prime number

where  is the notation for the double factorial.

For every integer , the number  is a square number.

References

External links

Integer sequences
Factorial and binomial topics